Santa Maria Formosa, formally The Church of the Purification of Mary, is a church in Venice, northern Italy. It was erected in 1492 under the design by Renaissance architect Mauro Codussi. It lies on the site of a previous church dating from the 7th century, which, according to tradition, was one of the eight founded by San Magno, bishop of Oderzo. The name "formosa" relates to an alleged appearance of the Holy Virgin disguised as a voluptuous woman1.

Exterior  
The plan is on the Latin cross, with a nave and two aisles. The two façades were commissioned in 1542, the Renaissance-style one facing the canal, and 1604, the Baroque one facing the nearby square.
The dome of the church was rebuilt in after falling during an earthquake in 1688.

Interior 

The artworks in the interior include the Saint Barbara polyptych by Palma the Elder, one of his most celebrated works. The Conception Chapel houses a triptych of Madonna of Misericordia by Bartolomeo Vivarini (1473), while in the Oratory is the Madonna with Child and St. Dominic by Giambattista Tiepolo (18th century). There is also a Last Supper by Leandro Bassano.

See also
Palazzo Grimani di Santa Maria Formosa
Palazzo Zorzi Galeoni nearby palace by Mauro Codussi
Palazzo Malipiero-Trevisan
History of medieval Arabic and Western European domes
History of Italian Renaissance domes
History of early modern period domes

Sources
 Chorusvenezia

Roman Catholic churches completed in 1492
15th-century Roman Catholic church buildings in Italy
Roman Catholic churches in Venice
Renaissance architecture in Venice
Churches in Castello, Venice